Say You may refer to:
 Say You (Ronnie Dove song)
 Say You (Motown song)